2013 Xinjiang ethnic clashes may refer to:

 April 2013 Bachu unrest
 June 2013 Shanshan riots